Friends is an American television sitcom created by David Crane and Marta Kauffman for NBC. Starring Jennifer Aniston as Rachel Green, Courteney Cox as Monica Geller, Lisa Kudrow as Phoebe Buffay, Matt LeBlanc as Joey Tribbiani, Matthew Perry as Chandler Bing, and David Schwimmer as Ross Geller, it premiered on September 22, 1994, as part of NBC's Must See TV lineup. Its finale aired on May 6, 2004, after ten seasons and 236 episodes. The show follows the characters' personal and professional lives in New York City; according to Crane and Kauffman's original pitch, the show "is about friendship because when you're single and in the city, your friends are your family". Friends became a massive success both during and after its run, and it has frequently been named one of the greatest television shows of all time.

The series has been recognized with numerous accolades, including six Primetime Emmy Awards from sixty-two nominations. At the 54th Primetime Emmy Awards in 2002, Friends won the Emmy for Outstanding Comedy Series for its eighth season, which coincided with the year the show was the most-watched program in the United States; it received five additional nominations for Outstanding Comedy Series during its run. The main cast members all submitted themselves for supporting acting nominations at the Emmys until 2002, when they submitted themselves for lead acting. Kudrow won the award for Outstanding Supporting Actress in a Comedy Series at the 50th Primetime Emmy Awards in 1998, while Aniston won for Outstanding Lead Actress in a Comedy Series in 2002; LeBlanc, Perry, and Schwimmer also received Emmy nominations for their performances. Michael Lembeck won an Emmy for directing "The One After the Superbowl", and Bruce Willis and Christina Applegate won Emmys for their guest performances.

Friends was also recognized by many guilds and critics' associations. It won two Screen Actors Guild Awards – one for its ensemble and one for Kudrow – from fourteen nominations. Additionally, it received nominations for a Directors Guild of America Award, two Producers Guild of America Awards, and two Writers Guild of America Awards. The show was nominated for ten Golden Globe Awards and nine Satellite Awards, winning one of each for Aniston's and Kudrow's performances, respectively. It was nominated for six Television Critics Association Awards before receiving the TCA Heritage Award in 2018. The show also saw large success from awards selected by the public, winning eleven People's Choice Awards and twelve Teen Choice Awards. Internationally, the series won a British Academy Television Award and three Logie Awards and earned nominations for two Banff Rockie Awards, a British Comedy Award, and eight National Television Awards.

Awards and nominations

Total nominations and awards for the cast

Notes

Nominees for awards

Other

References

External links 
 

Friends
Awards